János Zatykó (born February 12, 1948) is a Hungarian agrarian engineer and politician, member of the National Assembly (MP) for Komárom (Komárom-Esztergom County Constituency IV) from 1994 to 2010. He also served as mayor of Komárom between April 25, 1999 and October 3, 2010.

Zatykó was a member of the Hungarian Socialist Workers' Party (MSZMP) between 1979 and 1989. After the end of Communism in Hungary, he became a non-partisan politician. He was elected MP for Komárom for the first time in the 1994 parliamentary election. He joined the Hungarian Socialist Party (MSZP) on July 1, 1996. He was a member of the Committee on Agriculture from May 14, 1996 to May 13, 2010. Zatykó was elected mayor of Komárom during a by-election which was held after the sudden death of the previous mayor Gyula Krajczár.

References

1948 births
Living people
Hungarian engineers
Members of the Hungarian Socialist Workers' Party
Hungarian Socialist Party politicians
Members of the National Assembly of Hungary (1994–1998)
Members of the National Assembly of Hungary (1998–2002)
Members of the National Assembly of Hungary (2002–2006)
Members of the National Assembly of Hungary (2006–2010)
Mayors of places in Hungary
People from Nagykőrös